The Wunonglong Dam (Chinese: 乌弄龙水电站) is a gravity dam situated on the Lancang (Mekong) River in Weixi Lisu Autonomous County, Yunnan of Yunnan Province, China. The primary purpose of the dam is hydroelectric power production. Construction on the dam began in 2010 and the river was diverted around the foundation in November 2014. In 2016, construction began on the main dam, which was subsequently completed in 2017. By July 2019, all four hydroelectric generators were operational and the power station was operating at its full capacity of 990 MW.

See also

Hydropower in the Mekong River Basin
List of tallest dams in the world
List of dams and reservoirs in China
List of tallest dams in China

References

Dams in China
Dams in the Mekong River Basin
Gravity dams
Dams under construction in China
Hydroelectric power stations in Yunnan
Buildings and structures in Dêqên Tibetan Autonomous Prefecture
Roller-compacted concrete dams